The Hīt shooting occurred on 30 October 2014 when insurgents from the Islamic State of Iraq and the Levant killed at least 75 members of the Albu Nimr tribe in Hīt, a town in Al Anbar Governorate.

See also
 American-led intervention in Iraq (2014–present)
 Fall of Hīt (2014)
 List of terrorist incidents in July–December 2014
 List of terrorist incidents linked to ISIL
 List of mass car bombings
 Military intervention against ISIL
 Number of terrorist incidents by country
 Timeline of ISIL-related events (2014)
 List of Islamist terrorist attacks
 Timeline of the Iraq War (2014)
 War on Terror

References

External links
 http://www.start.umd.edu/gtd/search/IncidentSummary.aspx?gtdid=201410300035

2014 murders in Iraq
21st-century mass murder in Iraq
ISIL terrorist incidents in Iraq
Mass murder in Iraq
Mass murder in 2014
Al Anbar Governorate
Terrorist incidents in Iraq in 2014
October 2014 events in Iraq